Eungai railway station is located on the North Coast line in New South Wales, Australia. It serves the town of Eungai, opening on 1 July 1919 when the line was extended from Kempsey to Macksville. Opposite the station lies a passing loop. It was extended to 1.5 kilometres in January 1996.

Platforms and services
Eungai has one platform. Each day northbound XPT services operate to Grafton  and Casino, with only the Grafton XPT southbound service stopping to Sydney. This station is a request stop, so the train stops only if passengers booked to board/alight here. The Brisbane, southbound Brisbane and the southbound Casino XPT's pass through this station without stopping.

References

External links
Eungai station details Transport for New South Wales

Easy Access railway stations in New South Wales
Railway stations in Australia opened in 1919
Regional railway stations in New South Wales
North Coast railway line, New South Wales